Paul Nowell, known professionally as Paul The Trombonist, is a Los Angeles-based music producer, educator composer songwriter, performer, and trombonist.

Education
Paul graduated from Berklee College of Music on scholarship where he studied with some of other notable trombonists like Phil Wilson.

Career
Paul's Berklee College of Music professor Phil Wilson flew out to Los Angeles to collaborate on a video series called the Phil Wilson/Paul The Trombonist videos series. This led to the development of internet show Bone Masters in which Paul features other trombonists. This resulted in a large educational video library about the trombone that on its own became notable.

Arturo Sandoval met Paul in Los Angeles and partnered with him to create a series of online videos. Their cover of the song Peanut Vendor went viral and as of March 2017 it had 1.4 Million views on Facebook.

Paul has also been a trombonist in Aretha Franklin's band as well as performed with Family Guy creator Seth MacFarlane, Frankie Valli.

Paul's debut album was Journey to the World. The album received critical acclaim for fusing acoustic trombone with the electronic world. The album also charted on Amazon's best seller list at #26 for jazz sales and #34 in the electronic music category in its first week. His live show is an extension of the album using trombone, looping, keyboards and DJing. He currently serves as a voting member of The Recording Academy for the Annual Grammy Awards.
Paul is credited with private performances in front of celebrities like Leonardo DiCaprio, Martin Scorsese, Sean Penn, Charlize Theron, Robert Pattinson, Zac Efron, Bill Maher and Ryan Seacrest. Paul has often fused his music, on stage, with the comedian Sinbad's performances.

Discography

Albums
2017: Journey to the World

References

External links 
Official Website
Paul The Trombonist at AllMusic
Paul The Trombonist discography at Discogs

American jazz trombonists
Male trombonists
Berklee College of Music alumni
21st-century trombonists
Living people
21st-century American male musicians
American male jazz musicians
Year of birth missing (living people)